Dhankar Gompa (also Dankhar, Drangkhar or Dhangkar Gompa; Brang-mkhar or Grang-mkhar) is a village and also a Gompa, a Buddhist temple in the district of Lahaul and Spiti in India.  It is situated at an elevation of 3,894 metres (12,774 feet) in the Spiti Valley above Dhankar Village, between the towns of Kaza and Tabo.  The complex is built on a 1000-foot (300-metre) high spur overlooking the confluence of the Spiti and Pin Rivers - one of the world's most spectacular settings for a gompa. Dhang or dang means cliff, and kar or khar means fort. Hence Dhangkar means fort on a cliff.

Dhankar, like Key Monastery and Tangyud Monastery in Spiti, and Thiksey, Likir and Rangdum monasteries in Ladakh, was built as a fort monastery on the Central Tibetan pattern. It was reported to have had 90 monks in 1855.

Overview
Below the Gompa lies the small village of Shichilling which contains the new Dhankar Monastery, home to about 150 monks belonging to the Gelug school of Tibetan Buddhism.

Beyond the surrounding harsh, lunar landscape, notable sights at Dhankar Gompa include a statue of Vairocana consisting of four figures seated back-to-back, in addition to various crumbling thangkas.
There is a small museum in the gompa. In 2006, World Monuments Fund selected Dhankar gompa as one of the 100 most endangered sites in the world. A nonprofit group, Dhangkar Initiative, is attempting to organize its conservation.

Dhankar is approachable by a motorable road, good for small vehicles only, that branches off for Dhankar from the main Kaza-Samdu road at a point around 24 km from Kaza.  The branch road is 8 km in length up to Dhankar.

History
Dhankar was the traditional capital of the Spiti Valley Kingdom during the 17th century and has some features dating back to the 12th century. It was the seat of the early rulers of Spiti, the Nonos, who had the right to cultivate the government lands nearby and were required to keep the fort in repair. They also dispensed justice to the people and were noted for their harsh penalties until the British replaced them.

The monastery is also referred to as Lhaöpé Gönpa:

A new Teaching Temple was inaugurated by the Fourteenth Dalai Lama on 12 July 2009.

Footnotes

References 
Francke, A. H. (1914, 1926). Antiquities of Indian Tibet. Two Volumes. Calcutta. 1972 reprint: S. Chand, New Delhi.
Handa, O. C. (1987). Buddhist Monasteries in Himachal Pradesh. Indus Publishing Company, New Delhi. .
Kapadia, Harish. (1999). Spiti: Adventures in the Trans-Himalaya. 2nd Edition. Indus Publishing Company, New Delhi. .

Gallery

Gelug monasteries and temples
Buddhist monasteries in Himachal Pradesh
Tibetan Buddhist monasteries and temples in India
Buddhism in Lahaul and Spiti district
Buildings and structures in Lahaul and Spiti district